Tommaso di Giovanni Masini ( – 1520), known as Zoroastro da Peretola, was a friend and collaborator of Leonardo da Vinci.

According to Scipione Ammirato, he was born in Peretola, near Florence, and he was the child of a gardener, although he said he was the Illegitimate child of Bernardo Rucellai, Lorenzo il Magnifico brother-in-law.

In 1505 he returned to Florence and worked with Leonardo in The Battle of Anghiari.

He was buried at the Church of Sant'Agata dei Goti.

References

1462 births
1520 deaths
Leonardo da Vinci
Deaths from cholera